Diana, Princess of Wales: Tribute is a 1997 compilation album released in memory of Diana, Princess of Wales, with participation from a great number of renowned artists. The proceeds from sales of the album went towards the Diana, Princess of Wales Memorial Fund charity created in her memory.

The album, released on 2 December 1997 on double CD and cassette, brings together 36 songs from some of the biggest names in several genres of music, who dedicate both well-known and brand new material to the memory of Diana, Princess of Wales, who had died three months earlier, on 31 August 1997.

The album notably omits Elton John's own tribute song to Diana, "Candle in the Wind 1997", a re-working of his earlier hit song of the 1970s.

Track list
Disc 1
"Who Wants to Live Forever" – Queen
"You Have Been Loved" – George Michael
"Angel" – Annie Lennox
"Make Me a Channel of Your Peace" – Sinéad O'Connor
"Miss Sarajevo" – Passengers / Luciano Pavarotti
"Shakespeare's Sonnet No. 18" – Bryan Ferry
"Little Willow" – Paul McCartney
"Tears in Heaven" – Eric Clapton
"Everybody Hurts" – R.E.M.
"Streets of Philadelphia" – Bruce Springsteen
"Don't Dream It's Over" – Neil Finn
"Hymn to Her" – The Pretenders
"Love Minus Zero/No Limit" – Rod Stewart
"In the Sun" – Peter Gabriel
"Watermark" – Enya
"Evergreen (Love Theme from A Star Is Born)" – Barbra Streisand
"Every Nation" – Red Hot R+B All Stars
"I'll Fly Away" – Aretha Franklin
  
Disc 2
"I'll Be Missing You" – Puff Daddy
"Because You Loved Me" – Celine Dion
"Gone Too Soon" – Michael Jackson
"You Were Loved" – Whitney Houston
"You Gotta Be" – Des'ree
"Hero" – Mariah Carey (live)
"Prayer for the Dying" – Seal
"Missing You" – Diana Ross
"Wish You Were Here" – Bee Gees
"How Could an Angel Break My Heart" – Toni Braxton / Kenny G
"Love Is a Beautiful Thing" – Tina Turner
"All That Matters" – Cliff Richard
"Mama" – Spice Girls
"Don't Wanna Lose You" – Gloria Estefan
"Stars" – Simply Red
"Ave Maria" – Michael Bolton / Plácido Domingo
"Pavane" – Lesley Garrett
"I Am in Love with the World" – Chicken Shed

Certifications

References

1997 compilation albums
Charity albums
Memorials to Diana, Princess of Wales
Tribute albums to non-musicians